Luana Volnovich (born 26 September 1979) is an Argentine political scientist and Justicialist Party politician. She currently serves as the Executive Director of the Comprehensive Medical Attention Program (PAMI), Argentina's biggest public health insurance agency, since 12 December 2019. Prior to that, Volnovich served a term as a National Deputy elected in Buenos Aires Province from 2015 to 2019.

Early life and education 
Luana Volnovich was born on 26 September 1979 in Rio de Janeiro, Brazil to Argentine parents exiled during the last civic–military dictatorship in Argentina (1976–1983). The family returned to Argentina in 1989. Volnovich studied and earned a licenciatura on political science at the University of Buenos Aires (UBA). She also counts with a post-graduate degree on Public Policy Administration and Control from the Latin American Faculty of Social Sciences (FLACSO).

During her studies at the UBA, she co-founded the Centro de Estudios Políticos (CEP; "Centre for Political Studies") alongside the economist Iván Heyn.

Political career 
Volnovich was one of the founding members of La Cámpora, one of the youth wings of the Front for Victory. In 2014, during the presidency of Cristina Fernández de Kirchner, Volnovich was appointed as National Director for the enlargement and strengthening of educational rights at the Ministry of Education. Her administration saw the implementation of the Progresar and FinEs educational social assistance schemes.

At the 2015 legislative elections, Volnovich was the 12th candidate in the Front for Victory list to the Argentine Chamber of Deputies in Buenos Aires Province. The list received 37.38% of the vote, and Volnovich was elected. She was sworn in on 10 December 2015. As deputy, Volnovich voted against the Mauricio Macri administration's pension reform in 2017, and introduced a bill to overturn it after it had passed the Chamber. She also voted in favor of the Voluntary Interruption of Pregnancy bill, which would have legalized abortion in Argentina, but was struck down by the Senate on 8 August 2018.

She was re-elected at the 2019 legislative election, this time as the second candidate in the Frente de Todos list, under Sergio Massa. She was easily re-elected, but was never sworn in as she was appointed as Executive Director of PAMI on 12 December 2019 by incoming president Alberto Fernández. Her seat in the Chamber of Deputies was replaced by Jimena López.

Personal life 
Volnovich was in a relationship with the economist Iván Heyn until his death in 2011. She has a son.

References

External links 

 Profile at pami.org.ar (in Spanish)
 

1979 births
Living people
Politicians from Rio de Janeiro (city)
Brazilian emigrants to Argentina
Citizens of Argentina through descent
People from Berazategui Partido
Argentine political scientists
Members of La Cámpora
Members of the Argentine Chamber of Deputies elected in Buenos Aires Province
Women members of the Argentine Chamber of Deputies
21st-century Argentine politicians
21st-century Argentine women politicians
University of Buenos Aires alumni